Aluminium monobromide is a chemical compound with the empirical formula AlBr.  It forms from the reaction of HBr with Al metal at high temperature.  It disproportionates near room temperature:
6/n "[AlBr]n"  → Al2Br6  +  4 Al
This reaction is reversed at temperatures higher than 1000 °C.

A more stable compound of aluminium and bromine is aluminium tribromide.

See also
Aluminium monofluoride
Aluminium monochloride
Aluminium monoiodide

External links
 Aluminum monobromide, NIST Standard Reference Data Program

Aluminium(I) compounds
Bromides